Time Was is a documentary television series that premiered on HBO on November 11, 1979. It was hosted by Dick Cavett with each program looking at one decade from the past starting from the 1920s up to the 1970s. The historical program looked at the lifestyles and society during the various periods of time. The series was followed up with two other HBO documentary series hosted by Cavett, Remember When and Yesteryear.

See also
 List of programs broadcast by HBO

References

External links
 

1979 American television series debuts
1979 American television series endings
1970s American documentary television series
HBO original programming
English-language television shows
HBO Shows (series) WITHOUT Episode info, list, or Article